This is a list of notable reported sightings of unidentified flying objects (UFOs) arranged by date. It includes reports of close encounters and abductions. This list is not an endorsement of the extraterrestrial hypothesis, the psychosocial hypothesis, the interdimensional hypothesis, the field of ufology in general, or UFO religions.

The term UFO was coined by officer Edward J. Ruppelt who investigated aerial phenomena for the United States Air Force in his role as leader of Project Blue Book during the 1950s. Before Project Blue Book, UFOs were often referred to as "flying saucers" in reference to the widely publicized Kenneth Arnold UFO sighting. Ruppelt explained that "the term 'flying saucer' is misleading when applied to objects of every conceivable shape and performance".

What would later be called UFOs were reported before the 1947 flying saucer craze. Allied pilots during World War II described them as foo fighters. In Sweden, early 20th-century UFOs were called Spökraketer or ghost rockets. Mystery airships reported in the late 20th century, are seen as predecessors to UFO sightings. Unexplained aerial phenomena have been recorded stretching back into antiquity. Prior to the Scientific Revolution, they were often interpreted through the lenses of gods, ghosts, demons, and omens. Rice University professor of religion Jeffrey J. Kripal says of UFO encounters, "These are not especially rare events, nor are they restricted to any culture, race, religion, or time period."

Antiquity

16th–17th centuries

19th century

20th century

1909–1948

1950–1974

1975–2000

21st century

By location
The lists below contain UFO reports mentioned above along with less notable UFO reports from the specific areas.

See also

 Table of reports during the 1947 flying disc craze – A sortable table of the hundreds of 1947 flying disc sightings.
 List of alleged extraterrestrial beings – A list of entities reported in conjuction with UFOs and believed by witnesses to be alien in origin, unrelated to astrobiology or xenobiology.
 List of UFO religions
 List of investigations of UFOs by governments
 List of UFO organizations – Private organizations that investigate UFO sightings.
 Extraterrestrial hypothesis – The proposal that UFO sightings are observations of physical craft piloted by biological aliens from another planet.
 Interdimensional hypothesis – The proposal that UFO sightings are the result of experiences with another dimension.
 Psychosocial hypothesis – The proposal that UFO sightings can be explained by social and psychological processes.

Notes and references

UFO-related lists